Drozgometva is a village in the municipality of Hadžići, Bosnia and Herzegovina.

Demographics 
According to the 2013 census, its population was 298.

Trivia
Ottoman grandvizier Hadım Ali Pasha (died in 1511) was a citizen of  Drozgometva.

References

Populated places in Hadžići